This is a list of the crossings of the Wallkill River (all bridges) from its mouth at Sturgeon Pool in Rifton, New York to its source at Lake Mohawk in Lake Mohawk, New Jersey.

Crossings

See also
 
 
 
 

Wallkill
Wallkill River
Wallkill River